Yasumasa Nagamine (Nagamine Yasumasa; born April 16, 1954) is a Japanese jurist who has served as an associate justice of the Supreme Court of Japan since 2021.

Education and Career 
Nagamine was born on April 16, 1954, in Japan. He attended the University of Tokyo and graduated from the College of Arts and Sciences in 1977. He served as a career officer in the Japanese Ministry of Foreign Affairs and ambassador for over 40 years before his appointment to the Supreme Court. Specifically, he served in the following roles:

 1977-1992: officer in Foreign Affairs Ministry
 1992-1995: Counsellor (adviser) in the Cabinet Legislation Bureau of the Prime Minister's Office
 1995-1996: Director of the Western Europe Division of the European Affairs Bureau, in the Ministry of Foreign Affairs
 1996-1998: Director of the Legal Affairs Division, Treaties Bureau (Ministry of Foreign Affairs)
 1998-2001: Officer in the Embassy of Japan in India
 2001: Ambassador to India
 2002-2004: Deputy Director-General of the North American Affairs Bureau, Ministry of Foreign Affairs
 2004–2006, 2010-2012: Deputy Director-General of the International Legal Affairs Bureau, Ministry of Foreign Affairs
 2006-2007: Deputy Director-General of the Foreign Policy Bureau, Ministry of Foreign Affairs
 2007-2010: Consul-General to the United States (San Francisco)
 2012-2013: Ambassador to the Netherlands
 2013-2016: Senior Deputy Minister for Foreign Affairs, Ministry of Foreign Affairs
 2016-2019: Ambassador to the Republic of Korea (South Korea) (On the website of the Supreme Court, it is listed as Ambassador to Korea. However, Japan only recognizes South Korea and has no diplomatic relations with North Korea.)
 2019-2021: Ambassador to the United Kingdom

Supreme Court 
On February 8, 2021, Nagamine was appointed to the Supreme Court of Japan. In Japan, justices are formally nominated by the Emperor (at that time, Naruhito) but in reality the Cabinet chooses the nominees and the Emperor's role is a formality.

Nagamine's term is scheduled to end on April 15, 2024 (one day before he turns 70). This is because all members of the court have a mandatory retirement age of 70.

References 

1954 births
Living people
Japanese jurists
Ambassadors of Japan to South Korea